Brevin Pritzl (born October 10, 1996) is an American basketball player for Leuven Bears in the Belgium and Netherlands basketball league, BNXT League.  Pritzl previously played for Tamiš of the Basketball League of Serbia and for Team FOG Naestved in the Danish basketball league, Basketligaen. Pritzl played college basketball for Wisconsin.

High school career
Pritzl attended De Pere High School in De Pere, Wisconsin. He finished as the leading scorer with 1,720 points.

College career
Pritzl hardly played as a redshirt freshman. He started 21 games as a redshirt sophomore, averaging 8.9 points and 3.8 rebounds per game. Pritzl averaged 4.8 points and 2.4 rebounds per game as a junior. As a senior, Pritzl averaged 8.0 points and 3.7 rebounds per game, helping Wisconsin finish 14–6 in the Big Ten and 21-10 overall. Pritzl shot 37.0% from behind the arc, third-best on the team behind Micah Potter and D'Mitrik Trice. The team won eight straight games before the season was cancelled due to the coronavirus pandemic.

College statistics

|-
| style="text-align:left;"| 2015–16
| style="text-align:left;"| Wisconsin
| 1 || 0 || 4.0 || .000 || .000 || .000 || .0 || .0 || .0 || .0 || .0
|-
| style="text-align:left;"| 2016–17
| style="text-align:left;"| Wisconsin
| 24 || 0 || 8.1 || .342 || .238 || .737 || 1.1 || 0.1 || 0.3 || 0.0 || 1.9
|-
| style="text-align:left;"| 2017–18
| style="text-align:left;"| Wisconsin
| 32 || 21 ||29.3 || .397 || .356 || .855 || 3.8 || 1.0 || 0.8 || 0.2 || 8.9
|-
| style="text-align:left;"| 2018–19
| style="text-align:left;"| Wisconsin
|34 || 0 || 19.6 || .463 || .410 || .833 || 2.4 || 0.5 || 0.1 || 0.3 || 4.8
|-
| style="text-align:left;"| 2019–20
| style="text-align:left;"| Wisconsin
| 31 || 7 || 21.7 || .389 || .370 || .850 || 3.7 || 0.7 || 0.2 || 0.5 || 8.0
|-
| style="text-align:left;"| Career
| style="text-align:left;"| 
| 122 || 28 || 21.7 || .403 || .366 || .833 || 2.8 || 0.6 || 0.5 || 0.1 || 6.1

Source:

Professional career
On July 27, 2020, Pritzl has signed with Tamiš of the Basketball League of Serbia.  Pritzl scored 42 points in a game on December 26, 2020. In August 2021, Pritzl signed with Team FOG Naestved from Naestved, Denmark to play in the Danish basketball league, Basketligaen
April 2022, Pritzl signed with Leuven Bears from Leuven, to play in the Belgium and the Netherlands basketball league, BNXT League

Eurocup

|-
| style="text-align:left;"| 2020–21
| style="text-align:left;"| Tamiš
| 30 || 29 || 28.3 || 50.0 || 39.6 || 89.0 || 2.5 || 2.0 || .6 || .1 || 13.4 || 11.4
|-
| style="text-align:left;"| 2021–22
| style="text-align:left;"| Team FOG Naestved
| 28 || 28 || 31.1 || 48.6 || 43.5 || 97.4 || 5.3 || 2 || 1 || .3 || 16.6 || 19.9
|-
| style="text-align:left;"| 2022–23
| style="text-align:left;"| Leuven Bears
| 0 || 0 || 0 || 0 || 0 || 0 || 0 || 0 || 0 || 0 || 0 || 0

Personal
Brevin's father, Brian, played college basketball at St. Norbert and Brevin's older brother, Brandon, played college basketball at Hillsdale College and is the current assistant men's basketball coach for the Wisconsin Green Bay Phoenix men's basketball team Brevin earned a bachelor's degree in kinesiology in December 2018 and master's degree in educational leadership and policy analysis in December 2019.

References

External links
Wisconsin Badgers bio
ESPN bio
Rivals.com Profile
Pritzl's Twitter

1996 births
Living people
American expatriate basketball people in Serbia
American men's basketball players
Basketball League of Serbia players
Basketball players from Wisconsin
KK Tamiš players
People from De Pere, Wisconsin
Shooting guards
Wisconsin Badgers men's basketball players
American expatriate basketball people in Denmark
American expatriate basketball people in Belgium